List of military corps — List of British corps in the First World War

This is a list of British army corps that existed during the First World War. Most of the corps operated on the Western Front.

Infantry

 I Corps – original BEF
 II Corps – original BEF
 III Corps – formed in France 1914
 IV Corps – formed in Belgium 1914, transferred to BEF
 V Corps – formed in France 1915
 VI Corps – formed in France 1915
 VII Corps – formed in France 1915
 VIII Corps – formed in Gallipoli 1915, moved to France
 IX Corps – formed in Gallipoli 1915, moved to France
 X Corps – formed in France 1915
 XI Corps – formed in France 1915, moved to Italy 1917
 XII Corps – formed in France 1915, moved to Salonika
 XIII Corps – formed in France 1915
 XIV Corps – formed in France 1916, moved to Italy 1917
 XV Corps – formed in Egypt 1915, reformed in France 1916
 XVI Corps – formed in Salonika 1916
 XVII Corps – formed in France 1916
 XVIII Corps – formed in France 1917
 XIX Corps – formed in France 1917
 XX Corps – formed in Palestine 1917
 XXI Corps – formed in Palestine 1917
 XXII Corps – formed in France 1917
 XXIII Corps – formed in England 1918

Cavalry/Mounted
 Cavalry Corps
 Desert Mounted Corps - formed in Palestine

See also
Egyptian Camel Transport Corps
Indian Labour Corps
Macedonian Mule Corps
Chinese Labour Corps
Maltese Labour Corps
Imperial Camel Corps
Labour Corps
Lists of World War I topics
List of British corps in World War II

External links 
British Corps in the Great War

 
Corps of World War I
War
British corps